Superbase may refer to:
 Superbase (chemistry)
 Superbase (database)

Disambiguation pages